Jackson Whipps Showalter (February 5, 1859 in Minerva, Kentucky – February 5, 1935 in Lexington, Kentucky) was a five-time U.S. Chess Champion: 1890, 1892, 1892–1894, 1895–96 and 1906–1909.

Chess career

U.S. Championship matches
Showalter won U.S. Championship matches against Max Judd (1891/92, +7−4=3), Albert Hodges (1894, +7−6=4), S. Lipschütz (1895, +7−4=3), Emil Kemény (1896, +7−4=4), and John Finan Barry (1896, +7−2=4).  He lost championship matches to Max Judd (1890, +3−7=0), S. Lipschütz (1892, +1−7=7), Albert Hodges (1894, +3−5=1), Harry Nelson Pillsbury (twice, 1897 (+8−10=3) and 1898 (+3−7=2), and Frank Marshall (1909, +2−7=3).

Other matches 
Other match results: William H.K. Pollock (1891, +3−2=3), Emanuel Lasker (1892/93, +2−6=2), Jacob Halpern (1893, +5−3=1), Adolf Albin (1894, +10−7=8), Dawid Janowski (four times: 1898, +2−7=4; 1899, +4−2=0 and +4−2=1; 1916, +2−7=2), Borislav Kostic (1915, +2−7=5), and Norman T. Whitaker (twice: 1916, +6−1=0 and 1918, +1−4=3).

Tournament record 
Cincinnati 1888, +8−0=2, first place; 
New York 1889, +15−17=8, ninth (Chigorin and Weiss won; the first draw in the second round did not count and had to be replayed); 
St. Louis 1890, +11−0=1, first; 
Chicago 1890, +13−1=0, first; 
Lexington 1891, +5−1=0, first; 
New York 1893 (Impromptu), +7−4=2, third (Em. Lasker won); 
New York 1893 (N.Y.C.C.), +5−3=1, third (Pillsbury won); 
New York (NYSCA) 1894, +3−0=1, second (Hodges won); 
Buffalo 1894, +3−1=2, first; 
New York 1894 (2nd City Chess Club Tournament), +5−3=2, third (Steinitz won); 
New York (NYSCA) 1895, +3−0=1 (second, D. G. Baird won); 
Brooklyn CC championship 1895/96, +3−1=0, withdrew after four rounds (Hermann Helms won); 
Nuremberg 1896, +3−10=5, sixteenth (Em. Lasker won); 
New York (NYSCA) 1898, +1−1=1, seventh (Koehler won); 
Vienna 1898, +12−16=6, fourteenth (Tarrasch won); 
Cologne 1898, +8−5=2, sixth (Burn won); 
London 1899, +7−10=9, eighth (Em. Lasker won); 
Paris 1900, +8−6=5, tenth (Em. Lasker won; the first draw did not count and had to be replayed); 
Munich 1900, +7−7=1, seventh (Pillsbury and Schlechter won); 
New York 1900, +6−2=2, second (Lipschütz won);  
Cambridge Springs 1904, +4−2=9, fifth (Marshall won);
Excelsior (Minnesota) 1915, +9−1=0, first; 
Tampa 1916, +3−4=2, second (W. Moorman won); 
Chicago 1916, +14−1=2, second (Ed. Lasker won); 
Lexington 1917, +4−3=1, second (Ed. Lasker won); 
Chicago 1918 +4−6=1, ninth (Kostic won); 
Cincinnati 1919, +6−3=1, fourth (Ed. Lasker won); 
Louisville 1922, +7−2=2, fourth (Factor won); 
Chicago 1926, +2−8=2, twelfth (Marshall won).

He also competed in the U.S. versus Great Britain international cable matches from 1896–1901, compiling a +4−1=1 record.

Assessment

Showalter was known as "the Kentucky Lion" after his birthplace and his hairstyle, which consisted of a thick mane down the back of his neck, and perhaps also his playing strength.  His wife Nellie was one of America's leading female players, who won a match against Emanuel Lasker at knight odds 5–2.

A variation of the Queen's Gambit Accepted is named after him (1.d4 d5 2.c4 dxc4 3.Nf3 Nf6 4.Nc3).

The famous "Capablanca Simplifying Manoeuvre" in the Orthodox Variation of the Queen's Gambit Declined (1.d4 d5 2.c4 e6 3.Nc3 Nf6 4.Bg5 Be7 5.e3 Nbd7 6.Nf3 0-0 7.Rc1 c6 8.Bd3 dxc4 9.Bxc4 Nd5) had in fact been used by Showalter in the 1890s, many years before José Raúl Capablanca played it.

Showalter was inducted in the World Chess Hall of Fame on August 7, 2010. His great granddaughter, Amy Showalter, attended the ceremony and accepted the plaque on behalf of the Showalter family. The content of the induction speech was supplied by Kevin Marchese of Columbus, Ohio, who is currently writing a biography on Showalter that was slated to be delivered in late 2016.  As of April 2021, the manuscript is nearly completed with aspirations to publish in early 2022.

References

Further reading 
 Harry Golombek: Golombek's Encyclopedia of Chess, Crown Publishers 1977.

External links

1859 births
1935 deaths
American chess players
19th-century chess players
20th-century chess players
People from Mason County, Kentucky